Gyula Mester (Torontálvásárhely, 1945) is a Hungarian scientist and Professor of Robotics at the University of Szeged. He is a member of the Hungarian Academy of Engineering.

Early life and education 

Gyula Mester was born on June 10, 1945 in Torontálvásárhely, Yugoslavia (now Serbia). He completed his bachelor's degree at University of Belgrade in 1970, followed by a master's degree in mechanical sciences from Belgrade University of Science in 1975. He then received his D. Sc. degree in Engineering Sciences from the University of Novi Sad in 1977.

Career 
Mester was appointed a lecturer at Subotica Technical College in 1974, where he primarily taught courses related to robotics. In 1979, he became an associate professor at University of Novi Sad. In 2000, he moved to the University of Szeged where he remains a member of the Faculty of Engineering in the Laboratory of Robotics.

In addition to his academic position, Mester is a member of the Public Body of the Hungarian Academy of Sciences. Gyula Mester was elected the Man of the Year 1997 and 2011 by the American Biographical Institute. From 27 November 2013 he is a full member of the Hungarian Academy of Engineering. His CV was published in the Marquis Who's Who in the World 1997.

Work

Professional activities
 cloud robotics
 fuzzy logic control
 industrial robots
 humanoid robotics
 autonomous wheeled mobile robots 
 rigid link flexible joints
 scientometrics
 sensor-based remote control
 soft computing techniques
 unmanned aerial vehicles

Research Papers
Gyula Mester is the author of 310 research papers; his h index=48  In the period 2009–2013, he was the author/co-author of the chapters in 4 Springer research monographs. 
Gyula Mester is a member in the Editorial Boards/Associate Editorship of 15 scientific journals and an invited reviewer for 22 scientific journals. 
Gyula Mester was also an invited reviewer of more proceedings of scientific conferences. He was 50 times plenary, keynote, invited lecturer and he participated in the organizing of the 53 national and international symposiums, conferences and congresses.

Main publications 
The main publications include:
	Motion control of wheeled mobile robots  (2006)
	Intelligent mobile robot controller design (2006)
	Obstacle avoidance of mobile robots in unknown environments  (2007)
	Obstacle avoidance and velocity control of mobile robots (2008)
	Obstacle – Slope avoidance and velocity control of wheeled mobile robots using fuzzy reasoning (2009)
	Wireless sensor-based control of mobile robots motion (2009)
	Virtual WRSN – modeling and simulation of wireless robot-sensor networked systems  (co-author, 2010)
	Scalable experimental platform for research, development and testing of networked robotic systems in informationally structured environments: Experimental testbed station for wireless robot-sensor networks (co-author, 2011)
	The modeling and simulation of an autonomous quad-rotor microcopter in a virtual outdoor scenario  (co-author, 2011)
	Sensor-based navigation and integrated control of ambient intelligent wheeled robots with tire-ground interaction uncertainties (co-author, 2011) 
	Unconstrained Evolutionary and Gradient Descent-Based Tuning of Fuzzy Partitions for UAV Dynamic Modeling (co-author, 2017)

See also
 Humanoid Robotics Project

References

Living people
1945 births
People from Kovačica
Serbian roboticists
Academic staff of the University of Szeged
University of Belgrade alumni
University of Novi Sad alumni